Karimabad-e Olya may refer to:
 Karimabad-e Olya, Anbarabad, Kerman Province
 Karimabad-e Olya, Rafsanjan, Kerman Province
 Karimabad-e Olya, North Khorasan

See also
 Karimabad-e Bala (disambiguation)